Benson Point is the ice-free headland forming the southwest extremity of Rugged Island in the South Shetland Islands, Antarctica. It is a northwest entrance point for Morton Strait.  The area was known to early 19th century sealers.

The feature is named after Elof Benson, First Mate of the American brig Hersilia under Captain James Sheffield, which visited the South Shetlands in 1819–20 and 1820–21.

Location

Maps
 Península Byers, Isla Livingston. Mapa topográfico a escala 1:25000. Madrid: Servicio Geográfico del Ejército, 1992.
 L.L. Ivanov et al. Antarctica: Livingston Island and Greenwich Island, South Shetland Islands. Scale 1:100000 topographic map. Sofia: Antarctic Place-names Commission of Bulgaria, 2005.
 L.L. Ivanov. Antarctica: Livingston Island and Greenwich, Robert, Snow and Smith Islands. Scale 1:120000 topographic map.  Troyan: Manfred Wörner Foundation, 2009.

References
 SCAR Composite Antarctic Gazetteer.
 

Headlands of the South Shetland Islands